The men's discus throw athletics events for the 2016 Summer Paralympics take place at the Rio Olympic Stadium from 9 September. A total of five events are contested for eight different classifications.

Schedule

Medal summary

Competition format 
The competition for each classification consisted of a single round. Each athlete threw three times, after which the eight best threw three more times (with the best distance of the six throws counted).

Results

F11
The F11 event took place on 9 September.

F37
The F37 event took place on 14 September.

F44
The F44 event took place on 11 September.

F52
The F52 event took place on 14 September.

F56
The F56 event took place on 17 September.

References

Athletics at the 2016 Summer Paralympics
2016 in men's athletics